Coccomytilina is a subtribe of armored scale insects.

Genera
Coccomytilus
Dactylaspis
Evallaspis
Finaspis
Mauritiaspis
Melayumytilus
Mitulaspis
Mohelnaspis
Prodigiaspis
Scleromytilus
Triaspidis

References

Lepidosaphidini